Alexander Johnson Musgrove (1881–1952) was a Scottish-born Canadian artist.

Life
He was born in Edinburgh, and studied at the Glasgow School of Art. Musgrove moved to Winnipeg, Manitoba, Canada, and founded the Western Art Academy.
He helped found the Manitoba Society of Artists.

Musgrove died in Winnipeg.
In 1986, a retrospective was held of his work.

References

External links
Mayberryfineart.com
Wag.ca

1881 births
1952 deaths
Artists from Edinburgh
Artists from Winnipeg
Alumni of the Glasgow School of Art
Scottish emigrants to Canada